The external iliac lymph nodes are lymph nodes, from eight to ten in number, that lie along the external iliac vessels.

They are arranged in three groups, one on the lateral, another on the medial, and a third on the anterior aspect of the vessels; the third group is, however, sometimes absent.

Their principal afferents are derived from the inguinal lymph nodes, the deep lymphatics of the abdominal wall below the umbilicus and of the adductor region of the thigh, and the lymphatics from the glans penis, glans clitoridis, the membranous urethra, the prostate, the fundus of the urinary bladder, the cervix uteri, and upper part of the vagina.

Additional images

See also
 Internal iliac lymph nodes

References

External links
 Diagram #1 at cancer.gov
 Diagram #2 at cancer.gov

Lymphatics of the torso